Lajos Hegedűs (born 19 December 1987) is a Hungarian football goalkeeper who plays for Szolnok. He is one of the best goalkeeper of the last decade in the Nemzeti Bajnokság I. In 2020, he was called up for the Hungarian national team but did not make an appearance.

Club statistics

Updated to games played as of 15 May 2021.

References 
HLSZ database

International career 
He was first called up to the senior side for November 2020 games.

References

1987 births
Living people
Footballers from Budapest
Hungarian footballers
Association football goalkeepers
MTK Budapest FC players
BFC Siófok players
Pécsi MFC players
Puskás Akadémia FC players
Paksi FC players
Nyíregyháza Spartacus FC players
Szolnoki MÁV FC footballers
Nemzeti Bajnokság I players
Nemzeti Bajnokság II players